Christiaan Huijgens (25 January 1897 – 11 January 1963) was a Dutch long-distance runner. He competed in the marathon at the 1920 Summer Olympics.

References

External links
 

1897 births
1963 deaths
Athletes (track and field) at the 1920 Summer Olympics
Dutch male long-distance runners
Dutch male marathon runners
Olympic athletes of the Netherlands
Sportspeople from Utrecht (city)
19th-century Dutch people
20th-century Dutch people